Gregori Chad Petree (born Shawnee, Oklahoma) is a musician who is best known as co-lead vocalist and guitarist of American new wave/indie/rock band Shiny Toy Guns. He also contributes music for production libraries such as Killer Tracks.

Bands

Chad's previous bands included: Paradigm, Cloud2Ground, R.R.D.S., Dangerous Insects, and the 90's pop group PC Quest.

PC Quest (1990-1992)

Chad participated in this band with his brother, Stephen Petree.

Paradigm (1995-1998) 
Stephen Petree and Chad Petree teamed up again for this band and released three albums on Owl Records label.  In 1995, they released Fish  and in 1996 they followed with singles and EP's of various version of Too Big for the Garage. [2]  Several songs were reimagined for the Cloud2Ground albums such as Face 2 Face on their E-Majn album.

Cloud2Ground (1998-2000)

While Cloud2Ground was started by Jeremy Dawson in 1996, Chad got back together with Jeremy in 1998. In 2000, they released a second album, The Gate (Beautiful).

Dangerous Insects (2001-2004)

Songs from Dangerous Insects, "Starts With One" and "Chemistry of a Car Crash" traveled with Chad to Shiny Toy Guns, appearing on We Are Pilots
along with "Rainy Monday" "You Are The One" and "Waiting"

Shiny Toy Guns (2002-present)

Chad is the co-founder along with Jeremy Dawson of Shiny Toy Guns. He is the guitarist and lead male vocalist.

Chad wrote and co-wrote many of the songs on We Are Pilots, Shiny Toy Guns's first album, as well as many song's from their second album, Season of Poison. His brother, Stephen Petree, helped write several songs on We Are Pilots as well.

Chad also co-wrote and co-produced six tracks on the 2005 album release The Other Side by recording artist LOU.

Hybridigital (2009-present)

Hybridigital is Jeremy and Chad's side project, and subsection of Shiny Toy Guns, where they put on live shows of remixes of their Shiny Toy Guns songs. They feature live guitars, keyboards, and (male) vocals.

Mirror Machines (2010)

A second band by chad and jeremy featuring "Stadium/Sci-fi rock". An EP, Pray For Rain, was released on Nov 11, 2021.

Equipment

Chad uses 
LogicPro / UAD -
Piano/Soft Synths -
Gibson, Schecter, Fender Guitars -
Fender, Schecter Basses

References
2.https://www.discogs.com/artist/942574-Paradigm-10

1978 births
Living people
Singers from Oklahoma
Musicians from Oklahoma City
Shiny Toy Guns members
21st-century American singers
21st-century American male singers